Samuel Xavier Brito (born 6 August 1990), known as Samuel Xavier, is a Brazilian footballer who plays as a right back for Fluminense.

Club career
In January 2019, Samuel Xavier signed a permanent contract with Ceará, after spending the previous campaign on loan at the club.

Career statistics

References

External links

1990 births
Living people
Footballers from São Paulo
Brazilian footballers
Association football defenders
Campeonato Brasileiro Série A players
Campeonato Brasileiro Série B players
Paulista Futebol Clube players
Associação Desportiva São Caetano players
Ceará Sporting Club players
Sport Club do Recife players
Clube Atlético Mineiro players
Fluminense FC players